Václav Jan Kopřiva (pseudonym Urtica) (8 February 1708 in Cítoliby – 7 June 1789 in Cítoliby) was a Bohemian composer and organist.

Life
Kopřiva was a son of the miller Václav Kopřiva (1672–?), from the neighboring village Brloh, and his wife Juditka Rozumová (1677–?). He received his first musical education from his godfather Martin Antonín Kalina, who was a cantor and a representative of another important music family in Cítoliby. He completed his studies in Prague, becoming an organist at the Crusaders' Church and studying with Franz Joseph Dollhopf.

Thereafter he worked as a cantor and organist in Cítoliby. With his wife Terézia, he had two sons Karel Blažej Kopřiva and Jan Jáchym Kopřiva, who both also became composers. His spiritual compositions have typical baroque characteristics and they employ pastoral poems and folksongs. His notable pupils include Jan Nepomuk Vent, Jan Adam Galina, Jakub Lokaj and both of his sons.

List of works
 Alma Redemptoris Mater, for soprano, alto, women choir, strings and organ
 Litaniae Lauretanae, for SATB, mixed choir, orchestra and organ
 Kyrie
 Pater de coelis
 Sancta Trinitas
 Sancta Maria
 Mater Christi
 Virgo prudentissima
 Vas spirituale
 Salus infirmorum
 Regina angelorum
 Missa pastoralis in D
 Missu brevis in C
 Offertorium pastorale in D "Hodie Christus natus est...", for soprano, mixed choir and chamber orchestra
 Offertorium pastorale in A "Huc, huc ad regem pastorum", for soprano, mixed choir, orchestra and organ
 Offertorium in D groot "Te Trinitas beata", for choir, orchestra and organ
 Offertorium ex D "Vox clamantis in deserto", for soprano, mixed choir, orchestra and organ
 Offertorium es D de sancto Joanne Baptista "Vox clemantis in deserto", for soprano, mixed choir, orchestra and organ
 Rorate coeli ex F, cantata for alto, tenor, mixed choir, strings and organ

References

Sources
 Dutch Wikipedia article

External links
 Biography 
 Soundbites of Cítoliby composers including V. J. Kopřiva

1708 births
1789 deaths
Czech Baroque composers
Czech Classical-period composers
Czech male classical composers
Czech classical organists
Male classical organists
People from Louny District
18th-century classical composers
18th-century male musicians
18th-century keyboardists